Seychelles competed at the 1996 Summer Olympics in Atlanta, United States.Seychelles failed to win its first olympic medal

Athletics

Men

Women

Boxing

Sailing 

Men

Mixed

Swimming

Weightlifting

References
Official Olympic Reports

Nations at the 1996 Summer Olympics
1996
1996 in Seychelles